This is a list of known American football players who have played for the Staten Island Stapletons of the National Football League. It includes players that have played at least one match with the team.



A
Julie Archoska

B
Bullet Baker, 
Bob Barrabee,
Dan Blaine,
Frank Briante,
Fred Brown
Ralph Buckley,
John Bunyan
Cornelius Bohan,

C
Bob Campiglio,
Stu Clancy,
Ed Comstock,
Rick Concannon,
Irv Constantine,
Cookie Cunningham

D
George Demas,
John Demmy,
Bob Dunn

F
Tiny Feather,
Bernie Finn, 
Jim Fitzgerald, 
Beryl Follet, 
Dick Frahm,
Harry Fry

G
Rosie Grant,
Hec Garvey,
Walt Godwin

H
Hinkey Haines,
Hoot Haines,
Willie Halpern,
Swede Hanson,
Les Hart,
Wilbur Henry, 
Grassy Hinton

I
Marne Intrieri

K
Jim Kamp,
Al Kanya,
Harry Kloppenburg,
Art Koeninger,
Paul Kuczo

L
Jim Laird,
Ed Lawrence,
Tom Leary, 
Doc Ledbetter,
Bob Lundell,
Tom Lomasney, 
Jack Lord

M
Charley Marshall,
Hersh Martin,
Les Maynard,
Harry McGee, 
Chief McLain,
Bing Miller,
Dave Myers

N
Jim Nicely,
Jack Norris

O
Henry Obst

P
Oran Pape,
Doc Parkinson,
Louie Pessolano,
Les Peterson

R
Herb Rapp,
Leo Raskowski,
Vic Reuter,
Mike Riordan,
Jack Roberts

S
Ollie Satenstein, 
Art Schiebel,
Jack Shapiro,
Ray Schwab,
Snitz Snyder,
Dave Skudin,
Sammy Stein, 
Mike Stramiello,
Ken Strong

T
Erk Taylor, 
Jimmy Tays,
Al Teeter

W
Bill Wexler, 
Firpo Wilcox, 
Basil Wilkerson,
Cy Williams, 
Ike Williams,
Mule Wilson,
Stu Wilson,
Doug Wycoff

Y
Izzy Yablock

References
List of All-Time Staten Island Stapletons Players

 
Stat